Rui Almeida Monteiro (born 15 June 1977) is a Cape Verdean retired professional football player.

Club career
Born in Cape Verde, he made his debut in professional football on 22 August 1998 for FC Dordrecht in a game against HFC Haarlem replacing Giovanni Franken in the 83rd minute.

He played in the Eredivisie for Sparta, but was released by the club after the 2002/03 season. He signed for Portuguese side Portimonense, only to return to Dordrecht in summer 2004. He was released by them in 2006 and later played for amateur sides Leonidas, Zwaluwen and ZBC'97.

See also
Sparta Rotterdam season 2001–02
Sparta Rotterdam season 2002–03

References

External links

Profile
VI Profile

1977 births
Living people
Sportspeople from Praia
Cape Verdean footballers
Cape Verde international footballers
Cape Verdean expatriates in the Netherlands
Association football wingers
FC Dordrecht players
Sparta Rotterdam players
Portimonense S.C. players
Eredivisie players
Eerste Divisie players
RKSV Leonidas players
VV Zwaluwen players